Duopoly can refer to:

Duopoly, a specific type of oligopoly where only two producers exist in one market
Duopoly (broadcasting), in the United States, a single company which owns two or more radio or television stations in the same city or community
Duopoly (entertainment company), a Canadian film and television production company
Political duopoly or two-party system, in which only two political parties participate in government